The Danger Trail is a 1917 American silent adventure film directed by Frederick A. Thomson and starring H.B. Warner, Violet Heming and Lawson Butt. It is based on the 1910 novel of the same title by James Oliver Curwood. It is a Northern (genre), set during the construction of the Hudson Bay Railway in Canada.

Cast
 H.B. Warner as John Howland
 Violet Heming as Meleese Thoreau
 Lawson Butt as Jean Croisset 
 Arthur Donaldson as Pierre Thoreau
 Richard Thornton as Maax Thoreau
 Harold Howard as MacDonald
 William F. Cooper as Jackpine 
 S.M. Unander as Thorne
 Arthur Cozine as François Thoreau

References

External links
 

1917 films
1917 Western (genre) films
American black-and-white films
Selig Polyscope Company films
Films directed by Frederick A. Thomson
Films based on American novels
Films set in Canada
Films based on novels by James Oliver Curwood
Silent American Western (genre) films
1910s English-language films
1910s American films